Elections to Liverpool Town Council were held on Saturday 1 November 1879. One third of the council seats were up for election, the term of office of each councillor being three years.

Four of the sixteen wards were uncontested.

After the election, the composition of the council was:

Election result

Ward results

* - Retiring Councillor seeking re-election

Abercromby

Castle Street

Everton

Exchange

Great George

Lime Street

North Toxteth

Pitt Street

Rodney Street

St. Anne Street

St. Paul's

St. Peter's

Scotland

South Toxteth

Vauxhall

West Derby

By-elections

Aldermanic By-Election, 4 February 1880

Caused by the resignation of Alderman Richard Cardwell Gardner.

Former councillor John Nicol (Conservative, West Derby, elected 1 November 1876) was elected as an Alderman by the Council on 4 February 1880.

No.16, North Toxteth, 18 February 1880

Caused by the resignation of Alderman John Woodruff. 

Councillor Arthur Bower Forwood (Conservative, North Toxteth, elected 1 November 1877) was elected as an Alderman by the Council on 4 February 1880.

No. 11, Abercromby, 18 February 1880

Caused by Thomas English Stephens (Liberal, Abercromby, elected 1 November 1879) ceasing to be a councillor.

No. 1 Everton, 18 February 1880

Caused by William Simpson (Independent, West Derby, elected 1 November 1879) ceasing to be a councillor.

No. 14, West Derby, 23 March 1880

Caused by William Simpson (Independent, West Derby, elected 1 November 1879) ceasing to be a councillor.

Aldermanic By-Election 5 May 1880 

The death of Alderman James Jack was reported to the Council on 5 May 1880.

His position was filled when former Councillor David MacIver MP was elected as an Alderman by the Council on 5 May 1880.

Aldermanic By-Election, 28 October 1880

The resignation of Alderman Henry Jennings on 21 October 1880, was reported to the Council on 28 October 1880.

Hugh Hawthorne Nicholson was elected as an alderman by the Council on 28 October 1880.

See also

 Liverpool City Council
 Liverpool Town Council elections 1835 - 1879
 Liverpool City Council elections 1880–present
 Mayors and Lord Mayors of Liverpool 1207 to present
 History of local government in England

References

1879
1879 English local elections
November 1879 events
1870s in Liverpool